Gallaecian, or Northwestern Hispano-Celtic, is an extinct Celtic language of the Hispano-Celtic group. It was spoken by the Gallaeci at the beginning of the 1st millennium in the northwest corner of the Iberian Peninsula that became the Roman province of Gallaecia and is now divided between the present day Spanish regions of Galicia, western Asturias, and the west of the Province of León and the  Norte Region in northern Portugal.

Overview
As with the Illyrian, Ligurian and Thracian languages, the surviving corpus of Gallaecian is composed of isolated words and short sentences contained in local Latin inscriptions or glossed by classical authors, together with a number of names – anthroponyms, ethnonyms, theonyms, toponyms – contained in inscriptions, or surviving as the names of places, rivers or mountains. In addition, some isolated words of Celtic origin preserved in the present-day Romance languages of north-west Iberia, including Galician, Portuguese, Asturian and Leonese are likely to have been inherited from ancient Gallaecian.

Classical authors Pomponius Mela and Pliny the Elder wrote about the existence of Celtic and non-Celtic populations in Gallaecia and Lusitania, but several modern scholars have  postulated Lusitanian and Gallaecian as a single archaic Celtic language. Others point to major unresolved problems for this hypothesis, such as the mutually incompatible phonetic features, most notably the proposed preservation of *p in Lusitanian and the inconsistent outcome of the vocalic liquid consonants, and therefore address Lusitanian as a non-Celtic language and not closely related to Gallaecian.

Characteristics

Some of the main characteristic of Gallaecian shared with Celtiberian and the other Celtic languages were (reconstructed forms are Proto-Celtic unless otherwise indicated):
 Indo-European *-ps- and *-ks- became *-xs- and were then reduced to -s-: place name AVILIOBRIS from *Awil-yo-brix-s < Proto-Celtic *Awil-yo-brig-s 'Windy hill (fort)', modern place name Osmo (Cenlle, Osamo 928 AD) from *Uχsamo- 'the highest one'.
 Original PIE *p has disappeared, having become a *φ sound before being lost completely: place names C(ASTELLO) OLCA from *φolkā- 'Overturned', C(ASTELLO) ERITAECO from *φerito- 'surrounded, enclosed', personal name ARCELTIUS, from *φari-kelt-y-os; place name C(ASTELLO) ERCORIOBRI, from *φeri-kor-y-o-brig-s 'Overshooting hillfort'; place name C(ASTELLO) LETIOBRI, from *φle-tyo-brig-s 'wide hillfort', or *φlei-to-brig-s 'grey hillfort'; place name Iria Flavia, from *φīweryā- (nominative *φīwerī) 'fertile' (feminine form, cf. Sanskrit feminine pīvari- "fat"); place name ONTONIA, from *φont-on- 'path'; personal name LATRONIUS, to *φlā-tro- 'place; trousers'; personal name ROTAMUS, to *φro-tamo- 'foremost'; modern place names Bama (Touro, Vama 912) to *uφamā- 'the lowest one, the bottom' (feminine form), Iñobre (Rianxo) to *φenyo-brix-s 'Hill (fort) by the water', Bendrade (Oza dos Ríos) to *Vindo-φrātem 'White fortress', and Baiordo (Coristanco) to *Bagyo-φritu-, where the second element is proto-Celtic for 'ford'. Galician-Portuguese  appellative words leira 'flat patch of land' from *φlāryā, lavego 'plough' from *φlāw-aiko-, laxe/lage 'flagstone', from medieval lagena, from *φlagĭnā, rega and rego 'furrow' from *φrikā.
The frequent instances of preserved PIE /p/ are assigned by some authors, namely Carlos Búa and Jürgen Untermann, to a single and archaic Celtic language spoken in Gallaecia, Asturia and Lusitania, while others (Francisco Villar, Blanca María Prósper, Patrizia de Bernado Stempel, Jordán Colera) consider that they belong to a Lusitanian or Lusitanian-like dialect or group of dialects spoken in northern Iberia along with (but different from) Western Hispano-Celtic:
 in Galicia: divinity names and epithets PARALIOMEGO, PARAMAECO, POEMANAE, PROENETIAEGO, PROINETIE, PEMANEIECO, PAMUDENO, MEPLUCEECO; place names Lapatia, Paramo, Pantiñobre if from *palanti-nyo-brig-s (Búa); Galician-Portuguese appellative words lapa 'stone, rock' (cfr. Lat. lapis) and pala 'stone cavity', from *palla from *plh-sa (cfr. Germ. fels, O.Ir. All).
 in Asturias the ethnic name Paesici; personal names PENTIUS, PROGENEI; divinity name PECE PARAMECO; in León and Bragança place names PAEMEIOBRIGENSE, Campo Paramo, Petavonium.
 in other northwestern areas: place names Pallantia, Pintia, Segontia Paramica; ethnic name Pelendones.

 Indo-European sonorants between vowels, *n̥, and *m̥ have become an, am; *r̥, and *l̥ have become ri, li: place name Brigantia from *brig-ant-yā < Proto-Celtic *br̥g-n̥t-y-ā < post-Proto-Indo-European (post-PIE) *bʰr̥gʰ-n̥t-y-ā 'The towering one, the high one'; modern place names in Portugal and Galicia Braga, Bragança, Berganzo, Berganciños, Bergaña; ancient place names AOBRIGA, CALIABRIGA, CALAMBRIGA, CONIMBRIGA, CORUMBRIGA, MIROBRIGA, NEMETOBRIGA, COELIOBRIGA, TALABRIGA with second element *brigā < Proto-Celtic *br̥g-ā < post-PIE *bʰr̥gʰ-ā 'high place', and AVILIOBRIS, MIOBRI, AGUBRI with second element *bris < *brix-s < Proto-Celtic *brig-s < *br̥g-s < PIE *bʰr̥gʰ-s 'hill (fort)'; cf. English cognate borough < Old English burg "fort" < Proto-Germanic *burg-s < PIE *bʰr̥gʰ-s.
 Reduction of diphthong *ei to ē: theonym DEVORI, from *dēwo-rīg-ē < Proto-Celtic *deiwo-rēg-ei 'To the king of the gods'.
 Lenition of *m in the group *-mnV- to -unV-: ARIOUNIS MINCOSEGAECIS, dative form from *ar-yo-uno- *menekko-seg-āk-yo- 'To the (deities of the) fields of the many crops' < Proto-Celtic *ar-yo-mno- ... .
 Assimilation *p .. kʷ > *kʷ .. kʷ: tribe name Querquerni from *kʷerkʷ- < PIE *perkʷ- 'oak, tree'. Although this name has also been interpreted as Lusitanian by B. M. Prósper, she proposed recently for that language a *p .. kʷ > *kʷ .. kʷ > *p .. p assimilation.
 Reduction of diphthong *ew to *ow, and eventually to ō: personal names TOUTONUS / TOTONUS 'of the people' from *tout- 'nation, tribe' < PIE *teut-; personal names CLOUTIUS 'famous', but VESUCLOTI 'having good fame' < Proto-Celtic *Kleut-y-os, *Wesu-kleut(-y)-os; CASTELLO LOUCIOCELO < PIE *leuk- 'bright'. In Celtiberian the forms toutinikum/totinikum show the same process.
 Superlatives in -is(s)amo: place names BERISAMO < *Berg-isamo- 'The highest one', SESMACA < *Seg-isamā-kā 'The strongest one, the most victorious one'. The same etymology has been proposed for the modern place names Sésamo (Culleredo) and Sísamo (Carballo), from *Segisamo-; modern place name Méixamo from Magisamo- 'the largest one'.
 Syncope (loss) of unstressed vowels in the vicinity of liquid consonants: CASTELLO DURBEDE, if from *dūro-bedo-.
 Reduction of Proto-Celtic *χt cluster to Hispano-Celtic *t: personal names AMBATUS, from Celtic *ambi-aχtos, PENTIUS < *kwenχto- 'fifth'.

Some characteristics of this language not shared by Celtiberian:
 In contact with *e or *i, intervocalic consonant *-g- tends to disappear: theonym DEVORI from *dēworīgē 'To the king of the gods'; adjective derived of a place name SESMACAE < *Seg-isamā-kā 'The strongest one, the most victorious one'; personal names MEIDUENUS < *Medu-genos 'Born of mead', CATUENUS < *Katu-genos 'Born of the fight'; inscription NIMIDI FIDUENEARUM HIC < *widu-gen-yā. But Celtiberian place name SEGISAMA and personal name mezukenos show preservation of /g/.
 *-lw- and *-rw- become -lβ-, -rβ- (as in Irish): MARTI TARBUCELI < *tarwo-okel- 'To Mars of the Hill of the Bull', but Celtiberian TARVODURESCA.
 Late preservation of *(-)φl- which becomes (-)βl- and only later is reduced to a simple (-)l- sound: place names BLETISAM(AM), BLETIS(AMA), modern Ledesma (Boqueixón) < *φlet-isamā 'widest'; BLANIOBRENSI, medieval Laniobre < *φlān-yo-brigs 'hillfort on the plain'. But Celtiberian place name Letaisama.
 *wl- is maintained: VLANA < PIE *wl̥Hn-eh₂ 'wool', while Celtiberian has l-: launi < PIE *wl̥H-mn-ih₂ 'woolly' (?).
 Sometimes *wo- appears as wa-: VACORIA < *(d)wo-kor-yo- 'who has two armies', VAGABROBENDAM < *uφo-gabro-bendā 'lower goat mountain' (see above).
 Dative plural ending -bo < PIE *bʰo, while Celtiberian had -bos: LUGOUBU/LUCUBO 'To (the three gods) Lug'.

Gallaecian appears to be a Q-Celtic language, as evidenced by the following occurrences in local inscriptions: ARQVI, ARCVIVS, ARQVIENOBO, ARQVIENI[S], ARQVIVS, all probably from IE Paleo-Hispanic *arkʷios 'archer, bowman', retaining proto-Celtic *kʷ. It is also noteworthy the ethnonyms Equaesi ( < PIE *ek̂wos 'horse'), a people from southern Gallaecia, and the Querquerni ( < *perkʷ- 'oak'). Nevertheless, some old toponyms and ethnonyms, and some modern toponyms, have been interpreted as showing kw / kʷ > p: Pantiñobre (Arzúa, composite of *kʷantin-yo- '(of the) valley' and *brix-s 'hill(fort)') and Pezobre (Santiso, from *kweityo-bris), ethnonym COPORI "the Bakers" from *pokwero- 'to cook', old place names Pintia, in Galicia and among the Vaccei, from PIE *penkwtó- > Celtic *kwenχto- 'fifth'.

Revival

In the 19th century a group of Romantic and Nationalist writers and scholars, among them Eduardo Pondal and Manuel Murguía, led a Celtic revival initially based on the historical testimonies of ancient Roman and Greek authors (Pomponius Mela, Pliny the Elder, Strabo and Ptolemy), who wrote about the Celtic peoples who inhabited Galicia;  there is currently a revival movement within Galicia (Spain) which often extends into Asturias, North Portugal and Sometimes Cantabria funded by the Celtic League in Galicia, this movement is championed by people like Vincent F. Pintado, Founder of the Gallaecian Language Revival Movement, Member of the United Celtic Nations, Sponsor of the Gallaecian Celtic League, Author of the Old Celtic Dictionary, However it is worth noting whether or not this is a legitimate language revitalisation project or a conlanging project.

See also
 List of Celtic place names in Galicia
 List of Celtic place names in Portugal
 Celtiberian language
 Continental Celtic languages
 List of Galician words of Celtic origin
 Portuguese vocabulary
 Galician Institute for Celtic Studies

References

Bibliography
 Búa, Carlos (2007) O Thesaurus Paleocallaecus, in 
 Curchin, Leonard A. (2008) Estudios GallegosThe toponyms of the Roman Galicia: New Study. CUADERNOS DE ESTUDIOS GALLEGOS LV (121): 109-136.
 DCECH = Coromines, Joan (2012). Diccionario crítico etimológico castellano e hispánico. Madrid: Gredos. .
 
 
 
 Luján Martínez, Eugenio R. (2006) The Language(s) of the Callaeci . e-Keltoi 6: 715-748.
 
 
 Prósper, Blanca María and Francisco Villar (2005). Vascos, Celtas e Indoeuropeos: Genes y lenguas. Ediciones Universidad de Salamanca. .
 
 
 Wodtko, Dagmar S. (2010) The Problem of Lusitanian, in 

Continental Celtic languages
Extinct Celtic languages
Celtic
Galician
Extinct languages of Europe
Extinct languages of Spain